Bayi may refer to these articles:

Chinese
Bāyī (八一, lit. eight-one, which means "August 1"), refers to the anniversary of the Nanchang Uprising, which is considered as the founding of the People's Liberation Army, and thus a common name used by entities in the People's Republic of China:
August First Film Studio
Bayi Kylin, a Women's Chinese Basketball Association team
Bayi Football Team, a men's association football team
Bayi Rockets, a men's Chinese Basketball Association team
Bayi Shenzhen, women's volleyball team
Bayi Square, in Nanchang, Jiangxi
Bayi Xiangtan, a women's association football team
Bayi, Nyingchi County, a town in Tibet
Bayi District, a District of Nyingchi in the Tibet
Bayi Subdistrict, a subdistrict in Tibet and seat of Bayi District
Nanchang Bayi, a men's soccer team
August 1st (aerobatic team), also called the Bayi Aerobatics Team

People
Saw Bayi, Aung San Thuriya Medal winner
Sethu Lakshmi Bayi (1895–1985), ruler of Travancore
Filbert Bayi (born 1953), Tanzanian middle-distance runner

Others
Bəyi, a village and municipality in the Kurdamir Rayon of Azerbaijan
Bayi people, a tribe in China